Dmitri Vasilyevich Samarkin (born 14 May 1980) is a former Russian professional football player.

Club career
He played in the Russian Football National League for FC Mordovia Saransk in 2007.

References

External links
 

1980 births
People from Saransk
Living people
Russian footballers
Association football defenders
FC Mordovia Saransk players
FC Novokuznetsk players
Sportspeople from Mordovia